Daniel Langre (born 7 March 1981) is a Mexican former professional tennis player.

Born and raised in Mexico City, Langre was national junior champion in multiple age groups and as a doubles player was a world number six ITF Junior. He played collegiate tennis for the USC Trojans and was a member of the 2002 NCAA Division I championship team. On the professional tour, he won one singles and three doubles titles at ITF Futures level. In 2004, he represented Mexico in a Davis Cup tie against Jamaica, winning both his singles and doubles rubber. He made the doubles semi-finals of a 2005 Challenger in Mexico City with his 37-year-old coach Leonardo Lavalle.

ITF Futures titles

Singles: (1)

Doubles: (3)

See also
List of Mexico Davis Cup team representatives

References

External links
 
 
 

1981 births
Living people
Mexican male tennis players
USC Trojans men's tennis players
Sportspeople from Mexico City
21st-century Mexican people